Sozopol is a Bulgarian association football club based in Sozopol, currently playing in the Second League, the second level of Bulgarian football.

History 
In 2008 Sozopol secured promotion to the South-East V AFG in their inaugural season. They spent six seasons in the division, moving to the brand-new 2000 capacity all-seater Arena Sozopol in 2012. The club finally won the South-East V group during the 2013/14 season, achieving promotion to professional football for the first time. During the same year, Sozopol reached the Round of 16 of the 2013–14 Bulgarian Cup, losing 8-1 on aggregate to Litex.

They finished their first B Group season in 6th place out of 16 teams, and expanded their stadium by building a South Stand, bringing the total capacity to 3,500. During the 2015–16 Bulgarian Cup, the team reached the quarterfinals for the first time, beating OFC Etar Veliko Tarnovo in the Round of 16 and A Group member PFC Botev Plovdiv in the 1/8 finals. They were eventually knocked out after a 3-0 defeat to CSKA Sofia, but finished the 2015-16 season in 4th place in the B Group, a record position for the club.

In 2018, Sozopol was relegated to the third tier after finishing second to last in the 2017-18 season. In 2020, Sozopol promoted to the Second League, after 2 years in the third tier.

League positions

Current squad 
As of 4 February 2023

For recent transfers, see Transfers summer 2022.

Honours 
Bulgarian B Group:
4th place: 2015–16, 2016–17

South-East V AFG:
Winners (2): 2013–14, 2019–20

Bulgarian Cup:
Quarterfinals (1): 2015–16

Past seasons

References

External links 
 Official page at Facebook
 Club profile at bgclubs.eu

Sozopol